Peguero Jean Philippe (born 29 September 1981), also known as Jean Philippe Peguero is a Haitian former professional footballer who played as a forward.

Club career
Peguero began his career with Haitian club Don Bosco FC, with whom he won the 2003 haitian League, and was named MVP and received the Golden Boot Award with 13 goals. He moved to Major League Soccer in March 2004 to play for Colorado Rapids. Peguero finished his first season with the Rapids with seven goals and four assists in 18 games. In his second season, he scored seven goals and had six assists before the Rapids traded Peguero to New York Red Bulls in April 2006 for Thiago Martins The deal also included the Red Bulls sending to the Rapids first-round and third-round picks in the 2007 MLS SuperDraft. Peguero scored six goals in 12 games for New York, in addition to two goals in a friendly match against German team Bayern Munich.

In July 2006, Peguero transferred to Danish Superliga club Brøndby IF. On 5 August 2006, he scored a goal in his debut for Brøndby; the third goal in a 3–0 win over AC Horsens. In his third league game for Brøndby, against Viborg FF on 20 August, Peguero ruptured the anterior cruciate ligament and medial collateral ligament in his right knee as he scored Brøndby's third goal in the 3–0 win. It was estimated that his recovery would last seven to eight months, but Peguero would play no more games for Brøndby.

On 15 April 2008, Peguero briefly joined the San Jose Earthquakes on loan from Brøndby, but persistent problems with his knee forced an early end to the loan.

After over two years out of the game, Peguero resumed his career when he signed with Fort Lauderdale Strikers of the North American Soccer League in April 2011.

In 2012, he returned to the Haitian club Don Bosco FC, his first club.

In March 2015, Peguero signed with Moca FC in the Dominican Republic. He later joined Real Hope FA before retiring from professional football.

International career
Peguero played nine games and scored seven goals for the Haiti national under-23 team. He made his full debut for the Haitian national team in a July 2003 friendly match against St Kitts & Nevis.

In March 2009, Peguero made a comeback for the national team, playing the last 16 minutes of a 4–0 friendly match loss to Panama. He was on the squad for the 2–2 draw against Jamaica, but did not play.

Honours
Don Bosco
 Ligue Haïtienne: 2003 Ouverture, 2014 Clôture

Brøndby IF
 Royal League: 2006–07

Colorado Rapids
 Rocky Mountain Cup: 2005, 2006

References

External links
Brøndby IF profile
Career stats at Danmarks Radio

1981 births
Living people
Haitian footballers
Association football forwards
Association football midfielders
Haiti international footballers
2013 CONCACAF Gold Cup players
Ligue Haïtienne players
Major League Soccer players
Danish Superliga players
North American Soccer League players
Liga Dominicana de Fútbol players
Colorado Rapids players
New York Red Bulls players
Brøndby IF players
San Jose Earthquakes players
Fort Lauderdale Strikers players
Haitian expatriate footballers
Haitian expatriate sportspeople in the United States
Expatriate soccer players in the United States
Haitian expatriate sportspeople in Denmark
Expatriate men's footballers in Denmark
Haitian expatriate sportspeople in the Dominican Republic
Expatriate footballers in the Dominican Republic
People from Port-de-Paix